Chuck Woolery: Naturally Stoned is an American reality television show that starred American game show host Chuck Woolery. Six episodes aired on GSN between June 15 and July 27, 2003. The series is centered around Woolery and his family, specifically his personal life and his work as host of GSN's original game show Lingo. The show placed strain on both Woolery's workload and his marriage.

Format
The show focuses on the life of Chuck Woolery, host of the Game Show Network (GSN) series Lingo. The series' title, "Naturally Stoned", is derived from a Billboard Top 40 song from 1968 by Woolery's former music group The Avant-Garde. Each half-hour episode combines elements from Woolery's personal life and a behind-the-scenes look at Lingo. The show also introduces viewers to the Woolery family's new residence in Park City, Utah, having moved there from Los Angeles in August 2002. When discussing how the show is produced, Woolery explains, "There's no script. There's no beginning, there's no middle and there's no end. There's no plot. So when do you have enough? Never. It's the job that never ends."

Production
The series was green-lit on December 1, 2002, under the preliminary title Chuck Woolery: Behind the Lingo. Game Show Network chief executive Rich Cronin explained, "We felt our fans loved Chuck, and if we did a reality show (about him), we'd have something that appealed to our current audience and bring in new viewers." Cronin added that it was important for the network to air original programming beyond game shows themselves: "We may get fans for this show who love reality series or love Chuck Woolery, but either way, it's important for us to break out of just doing studio-based game shows." The series was GSN's first attempt at producing a reality or documentary series. Over 400 hours of footage were recorded for the show.

Woolery was at first hesitant at being the show's subject. "I really wasn't in favor of it because I was looking at the Osbournes and Anna Nicole Smith, and I don't have a life like these people at all. I personally think watching me is kind of like having lunch with Pat Boone. It doesn't exactly rivet you to your chair." He later told the producers, "Maybe it will work if you edit it together and make it funny."

The series premiered on June 15, 2003, airing six episodes. It has never been released on DVD or Blu-ray, nor has it been made available through online streaming services.

Episodes

Reception
PopMatters Cary O'Dell opined, "This too-much-Chuck is a problem. Without a built-in curiosity factor...Chuck Woolery: Naturally Stoned is left with Woolery mugging for the camera or behind the scenes hijinks at Lingo. Neither is interesting enough to fill 30 minutes of TV." In his book Television Game Show Hosts: Biographies of 32 Stars, David Baber noted that "taping the reality series put tremendous pressure on Woolery's already troubled marriage." Woolery separated from his then-wife Teri Nelson while the series was airing. When previewing Carnie Wilson: Unstapled (a similar series that aired on GSN in 2010), CNN's James Dinan recalled the network's lack of success with reality television in the past, writing, "Anyone remember the horse racing-themed American Dream Derby or the Chuck Woolery-centric Naturally Stoned?  Neither lasted long."

References

Bibliography

External links
 

2003 American television series debuts
2003 American television series endings
2000s American reality television series
Game Show Network original programming